The D1 motorway is the main motorway of the Czech Republic. Currently it connects the two biggest Czech cities, Prague and Brno; in the future it will be extended to Ostrava and to the Czech–Polish border in Věřňovice (Karviná District) / Gorzyczki (Wodzisław County). It is the busiest motorway in the Czech Republic, with a maximum AADT of 99,000 vehicles per day near Prague.

History

First attempt 
The Munich Agreement in 1938 deprived the country of some fundamental road and rail routes. The government rushed to prepare three major infrastructure projects: the Německý Brod – Brno railway; the Plzeň – Ostrava road; and a 4-lane highway from Prague to Velký Bočkov (on the Czechoslovak – Romanian border). On 23 December 1938 the government issued Decree no. 372/1938 Coll. concerning the construction of motorways, establishing the General Motorway Directorate. This decree called for construction of an east-west motorway within four years.

As of January 1939, the General Motorway Directorate had 108 employees. On 13 January 1939, the Prague – Jihlava – Brno – Slovak border motorway project was approved, and construction was started on two segments: Chodov (now part of Prague) – Humpolec; and Zástřizly – Lužná. The prime minister of Carpathian Ruthenia, Avgustyn Voloshyn, requested that the Slovak border – Chust segment be added to the plan as well. Construction began on the Zástřizly – Lužná segment on 24 January in Zástřizly in the Chřiby mountains. 

The German occupation of Czechoslovakia brought only small technical changes to the project, and the construction of another segment, Chodov – Humpolec, began in May 1939. The increasing demands of World War II slowed down the construction, and the works were completely halted in 1942. After the war the works were resumed mainly on major bridges in 1946, but only with a small workforce.

After 1948 the works continued. But in January 1949 the segment in Chřiby was abandoned, and the Prague – Humpolec segment met the same fate one year later. All 77 km of motorway under construction at that time, including 60 bridges, remained in disuse.

Second attempt 

In the 1960s, traffic was growing very quickly, and a new plan for a D1 highway from Prague to the Soviet Union border was formulated. Work on the Prague – Brno section started in 1967, mainly using the old route from the first attempt. The 21-km long Prague – Mirošovice segment was completed in 1971, and the 205-km long route to Brno was finished in 1980.

In Slovakia, construction started in 1973 with the 14-km long Ivachnová – Liptovský Mikuláš section, together with the construction of the Liptovská Mara dam. The 19-km Prešov – Košice motorway was added in 1980. In the late 1980s and the early 1990s the 19-km long Brno – Vyškov segment was built, along with another 20 km from Liptovský Mikuláš to Hybe in Slovakia.

After the dissolution of Czechoslovakia, construction was no longer planned to Slovakia, but instead to Lipník nad Bečvou (the replacement of the planned route is the R49 expressway). Due to growing traffic near Prague, the first segment to Mirošovice was widened from 4 lanes to 6 lanes, and there are similar plans for widening around Brno as well. After the dissolution, no new sections were built. In 2002, construction of an 18-km long extension from Vyškov eastwards started. It was opened in 2005. More extensions eastwards were opened in 2008, 2009 and 2010; in 2011, the motorway reached the junction with the R55 expressway and the R49 expressway near Hulín, and the route curved north to Přerov (and Lipník nad Bečvou).

The segment from Lipník nad Bečvou to Ostrava was constructed from 2004 – 2009. Due to historical reasons it was named the Motorway D47; however, it was opened as part of the D1. The segment from Ostrava to the Polish border (and Autostrada A1) opened in late 2012, but only for cars under 3.5 tonnes, because the Polish side had problems with the bridge at Mszana village. From 2014 the bridge is open, and it is possible to drive from Ostrava to the Polish border and on to Katowice. The Přerov – Lipník nad Bečvou segment opened in December 2019.

The only section which is not yet completed is the Říkovice – Přerov segment. Construction on this segment started in 2022, with an expected completion date in 2026.

Highway elevation

 Maximum: 655 meters above sea level (km 104)
 Minimum: 197 meters above sea level (km 370)

Unfinished sections

Gallery

See also
 D1 (Slovakia)

References

External links
Exit list of D1 highway
Info on ceskedalnice.cz 
Info on dalnice-silnice.cz  
Info about pre-war bridges on dalnice.com

D01